Desmond Dennis "Bill" Reardon (30 October 1928 – 15 September 2004) was an Australian rules footballer who played with Footscray in the Victorian Football League (VFL).

Notes

External links 

1928 births
2004 deaths
Australian rules footballers from Victoria (Australia)
Western Bulldogs players
Mansfield Football Club players